Charles Milby Dale (March 8, 1893 – September 28, 1978) was an American lawyer and Republican politician from Portsmouth, New Hampshire.  He was the 66th governor of New Hampshire, serving from 1945 to 1949.

Early career
Dale was born in 1893 in Browns Valley, Minnesota, on the Minnesota—South Dakota border.  He attended the University of Minnesota, and then the University of Minnesota Law School; while in law school he served as Note Editor of the first volume of the Minnesota Law Review and graduated in 1917.  After law school he began a legal practice back in Brown's Valley, but upon the United States' entry into World War I he left to enlist in the United States Army.  Dale was assigned to the Coast Artillery Corps stationed in Portsmouth, New Hampshire.

Political career
After the war, Dale decided to remain in Portsmouth and open his legal practice there.  He soon found his way into politics; he was first elected city solicitor in 1921 and later mayor from 1926 to 1928.  He went back to legal practice but was elected in 1933 to the state senate, where he served as president.  In 1937 he was elected to the Executive Council of New Hampshire.  He returned to the state senate, then again served at the Mayor of Portsmouth from 1943 to 1944.  He entered the Governor's race and during the Republican primary election defeated incumbent Governor Robert Blood.  Dale then went on to win the general election and win reelection for a second two-year term.

Dale retired from politics in 1948 to work in banking and radio in New Hampshire.  He died in 1978 in Portsmouth.

References

External links
Dale at New Hampshire's Division of Historic Resources

1893 births
1978 deaths
Republican Party governors of New Hampshire
Republican Party New Hampshire state senators
Members of the Executive Council of New Hampshire
Mayors of Portsmouth, New Hampshire
Minnesota lawyers
Military personnel from Minnesota
United States Army soldiers
United States Army personnel of World War I
New Hampshire lawyers
Mayors of places in New Hampshire
University of Minnesota Law School alumni
People from Browns Valley, Minnesota
20th-century American politicians
20th-century American lawyers